Ada Noémi Karinthi, born Etelka Karinthi, later Adél Jusztina Karinthi, name variant: E. Ada Karinthy (20 October 1880, Budapest, – 31 May 1955, Budapest, Józsefváros) - Hungarian painter and illustrator, sister of the writer Frigyes Karinthy and wife of the painter Viktor Erdei.

Life
Daughter of József Ernő Karinthi and Karolina Szeréna Engel, a bourgeois family in Budapest. Her family was originally Jewish, but converted to Lutheranism shortly before her brother Frigyes was born (1887). Young Etelka played piano and wrote poems in childhood, before studying at the free school in Nagybánya artists' colony between 1906 and 1912. She exhibited at the National Salon (1914, 1916, 1917) and at the 1916/17 winter exhibition of the Hall of Art, mainly watercolors. She also produced works of applied art and book illustrations. On 14 June 1908 Viktor Erdei married non-denominational Ada in Budapest. Their marriage was dissolved in 1922, but they married again on 21 June 1924 in Budapest. Her death was caused by myocardial degeneration and pneumonia.

Bibliography 
 Magyar zsidó lexikon. Ed. Peter Ujvári. Jewish Lexicon, 1929.
 
 Magyar asszonyok lexikona. Compiled, prefaced and provided by Margit Bozzay. 1931. Stephanum St. 
 Gulyás Pál: Magyar írók élete és munkái. Hungarian Association of Librarians and Archivists, 1939-2002. From volume 7 to the press, reg. János Viczián.
 Karinthy E. Ada /Karinthy Ada Noémi, Erdei Viktorné/ (1880-1955) OMIKE

References 

Hungarian painters
1880 births
1955 deaths
Hungarian women artists
People of Hungarian-Jewish descent